GWR may refer to:

Transport
 Great Western Railway, British railway company 1833–1947
 Great Western Railway (train operating company), British railway company (1996–)
 Great Western Main Line, a railway line in the UK
 Great Western Railway (disambiguation), other railway companies and routes with the name
 Gloucestershire Warwickshire Railway, an English heritage railway
 Aura Airlines (ICAO airline code: GWR), a Spanish airline
 Gwinner–Roger Melroe Field (FAA airport code: GWR), Sargent County, North Dakota, USA

Media
 GWR Group, a defunct British commercial radio company, merged into GCap Media in 2005
GWR FM (Bristol & Bath)
 GWR FM Wiltshire
 GWR Records, a British record label
 Graswurzelrevolution, a German anarcho-pacifist magazine

Other uses
 Geographically weighted regression
 Guinness World Records
 Gwere language (ISO 639 language code: gwr)
 Llygad Gŵr, 13th-century Welsh poet

See also